Pelicans Ballpark (previously known as Coastal Federal Field, BB&T Coastal Field, and TicketReturn.Com Field) is located in Myrtle Beach, South Carolina and is the home field of the Myrtle Beach Pelicans, a minor league affiliate of the Chicago Cubs in the Carolina League. The stadium, located just off Highway 17 in Myrtle Beach, opened in 1999. It holds up to 6,599 people. Since its opening, it has been the finish point of the annual Myrtle Beach Marathon, held annually in March.

On April 16, 2021, Myrtle Beach Pelicans leaders told WPDE-TV that the facility would need a significant investments in order to keep Minor League Baseball there. The most urgent upgrades to Pelicans Ballpark are to the visiting and home clubhouses, additional team facilities for women staff members, and upgrades to lighting and wall height. The team general manager told the city council during its budget retreat that it is likely to cost $15 million to bring the stadium's current player development facilities up to par and that the stadium won't last another 20 years as it stands.

Other tenants
Pelicans Ballpark formerly was the site of the annual "Baseball At The Beach" collegiate baseball tournament which has since moved to Springs Brooks Stadium on the campus of Coastal Carolina University. While Charles Watson Stadium was renovated during the 2013 season, the Chanticleers played their home schedule at TicketReturn.com Field.

The venue served as a regional host site for the 2007 NCAA Division I baseball tournament. Coastal Carolina hosted the regional, with VCU, Clemson, and St. John's also participating. The ballpark also hosted a regional and super regional in the 2010 NCAA Tournament, with the Chanticleers ultimately losing the super regional to South Carolina in the Gamecocks' first national championship season.

The Texas Rangers (then parent club of the Pelicans) played an exhibition game on March 29 at Pelicans Ballpark against Coastal Carolina University as a part of 2011 spring training.

Season 3 of HBO's Eastbound & Down was filmed there.

References

External links
TicketReturn.com Field at Pelican Park
TicketReturn.com Field Facts & Figures 
TicketReturn.com Field Views – Ball Parks of the Minor Leagues
Texas Rangers At Coastal Carolina
Myrtle Beach Pelicans Ballpark to Get New Name 

Minor league baseball venues
Buildings and structures in Myrtle Beach, South Carolina
Baseball venues in South Carolina
Sports venues in Horry County, South Carolina
Coastal Carolina Chanticleers baseball venues
1999 establishments in South Carolina
Carolina League ballparks
Sports venues completed in 1999